Gunghalin United FC Womens is an Australian amateur women's association football club based in the Canberra district of Gungahlin, ACT. Established in 2015 by Gungahlin United FC, the team currently competes in the ACT Women's National Premier League with home matches played at Gungahlin Enclosed Oval.

History
In 2015, Gungahlin United FC established its first ACT elite level women's team to compete in the ACT Women's National Premier League. The team is full of local talent, showcasing notable players such as Sally Rojahn (Canberra United), Grace Field (Canberra United), Najwa Allen (Najwa FC), Brittany Palombi (Najwa FC), Ashleigh Palombi (WPL Golden boot 2012, 2013, 2015)

The Gungahlin women's team is known for having the most dedicated supporters in the WPL competition, many of whom travel from as far as Kambah to see the home games.

Current squad

Home venue
Gungahlin United's WNPL first team home venue is Gungahlin Enclosed Oval. The ground was constructed in 2013/14 with the official opening on 7 March 2014. The stadium has a seating capacity of 1,150 (550 under cover) and an overall capacity of 5,000. Gungahlin United is one of four tenants of the venue with the multi-purpose field being used for association football, Australian rules football, rugby union and rugby league. Canberra based Stewart Architecture was the architect of the stadium which cost stadium owner, the ACT Government, $12.5 million to build. The ground has a natural water-efficient grass surface, team and officials' changing rooms, public toilets, canteen and storage for both users and maintenance staff. Rooms are provided for coaches, the ground announcer and the operator of the electronic scoreboard. There is also a club room which can be used for after/pre-match functions.

Season-by-season results
The below table is updated with the statistics and final results for Gungahlin United FC following the conclusion of each ACT Women's National Premier League season.

See also
Gungahlin United FC
Sport in the Australian Capital Territory
Soccer in the Australian Capital Territory

References

External links
 Official club website
 Official club Facebook
 Capital Football home

2015 establishments in Australia
Association football clubs established in 2015
Soccer clubs in the Australian Capital Territory
Women's soccer clubs in Australia